Sarki Titara is a town and union council of Charsadda District in Khyber Pakhtunkhwa province of Pakistan.

References

Union councils of Charsadda District
Populated places in Charsadda District, Pakistan